Appassionata is the colloquial name of Piano Sonata No. 23 by Beethoven.

Appassionata may also refer to:
 Appassionata (1944 film), a 1944 Swedish film
 Appassionata (1974 film), a 1974 Italian erotic drama film
 Appassionata (Ramsey Lewis album), 1999
 Appassionata (Maksim Mrvica album), 2010

See also
Apasionada